Emil La Cour (born 19 July 1991) is a Danish former professional footballer. He played as a midfielder.

Career
Rising through the ranks of FC Svendborg, La Cour grew out to become a key player for the 2nd Division (third-tier) club, before being signed by local rivals FC Fyn on 25 June 2010. He had earlier been on a trial at AGF, without this amounting to a transfer. He established a strong partnership with Jeppe Grønning in the central midfield area while playing for FC Fyn, helping them achieve promotion to the second tier in the 2011–12 season.

In June 2012, La Cour signed a four-year contract with Silkeborg IF on 11 June 2012 after a successful trial, where he was initially placed in the reserve team. La Cour made his debut for Silkeborg in the Danish Superliga on 1 September 2012, coming on as an 86th-minute substitute for Marvin Pourié against AGF, a match which Silkeborg lost 0–4. A few days later, on 4 September, he played against his former club, FC Svendborg, in a Danish Cup matchup at Høje Bøge Stadium, with Silkeborg winning 2–0. La Cour made a total of seven appearances for the club.

On 2 September 2013, La Cour's contract with Silkeborg was terminated and he instead signed with Danish 1st Division (second-tier) club BK Marienlyst.

References

External links
 Profile at Superstats

1991 births
Living people
Danish men's footballers
Association football midfielders
SfB-Oure FA players
FC Fyn players
Silkeborg IF players
BK Marienlyst players
Danish Superliga players
Danish 1st Division players
Danish 2nd Division players
People from Svendborg
Sportspeople from the Region of Southern Denmark